FC Ivan Odesa is an amateur Ukrainian football club from Odesa. Ivan plays at the Ivan Stadium.

The club was founded in 1998 and at first was representing the village of Nerubaiske, Biliaivka Raion. Between 2003–2007 it played at the national amateur competitions and the 2007 UEFA Regions' Cup.

Honours
 Ukrainian football championship among amateurs
 Winner(s) (1): 2005
 Odesa Oblast cup
 Winner(s) (1): 2004

References

External links
 Profile at UEFA website

 
Football clubs in Odesa
Amateur football clubs in Ukraine
Association football clubs established in 1998
1998 establishments in Ukraine